The Comley Limestone is an Early Cambrian Lagerstätte exposed in Comley, Shropshire, England.  It is known for its phosphatic microfossils, which can be extracted by acid maceration and are preserved in three dimensions in a similar fashion to the Orsten fossils.  It represents around 10 million years of deposition, and was deposited from 519 to 501 million years ago.

See also
Geology of Shropshire

References 

Lagerstätten
Geology of Shropshire
Ordovician south paleopolar deposits